Torella dei Lombardi is a town and comune in the province of Avellino, Campania, southern Italy.

History
The town was firstly mentioned in the 9th century as Turella. In 1980, along with many other settlements in the province and the neighbouring areas, was heavily damaged during the Irpinia earthquake.

Geography
Torella is a hillside town located in the middle of Irpinia, close to the sources of the river Ofanto, 11 km west of Lioni and 41 east of Avellino. It borders with the municipalities of Castelfranci, Nusco, Paternopoli, Sant'Angelo dei Lombardi and Villamaina.

Main sights
The Lombard Candriano Castle, located in the middle of the town.
The Monumental Fountain (19th century), located in the lower side of the town.

People
Roberto Roberti (1879–1959), actor, screenwriter and film director. He was the father of Sergio Leone
Bice Valerian (1886–1969), silent film actress. Born in Rome and died in Torella, she was the mother of Sergio Leone
Giovanni Preziosi (1881–1945), fascist politician noted for his antisemitism

References

External links

 Official website 
Torella dei Lombardi on tuttaitalia.it 
 Ottopagine: Torella dei Lombardi-related articles (provincial newspaper) 

Cities and towns in Campania